View Askew Productions is an American film and television production company founded by Kevin Smith and Scott Mosier in 1994. Actors Ben Affleck, Jeff Anderson, Matt Damon, Chris Rock, Walter Flanagan, Bryan Johnson, Jason Lee, Jason Mewes, Brian O'Halloran, Ethan Suplee and Smith himself are just some of the stars that frequently appear in projects under the View Askew banner.

History
Smith and Mosier founded the company in 1994 to produce their first film, Clerks, which was the first film in what is now known as the View Askewniverse.  After the film became a success View Askew obtained a larger budget and produced Mallrats in 1995, which underperformed critically and commercially but found success after being released on home video. This film was soon followed by 1997's Chasing Amy and 1999's Dogma.

Beginning the new millennium, View Askew briefly produced Clerks: The Animated Series, a short-lived animated series based on Clerks, which only aired six episodes. They later released Jay and Silent Bob Strike Back, which starred Smith and old friend Jason Mewes as their characters originated in Clerks and appear in most View Askew and View Askewniverse related material, Jay and Silent Bob. This film was later followed by the first non-Askewniverse film, Jersey Girl, which featured many of Smith's frequent cast members.

Two years after Jersey Girl, View Askew released Clerks II, the first true sequel to a previous Smith film, which features the main characters of the film Clerks continuing ten years later.  This film was followed by the second non-Askewniverse film, Zack and Miri Make a Porno.

The company has also released several of Smith's non-fiction works, such as his four question and answer DVDs, An Evening With Kevin Smith in 2002, An Evening With Kevin Smith 2: Evening Harder in 2006, Sold Out: A Threevening with Kevin Smith in 2008 and Kevin Smith: Too Fat for 40 in 2011. It has also produced Sucks Less with Kevin Smith, a show which features (at least) three UCLA students who are enrolled in a class about cinematography in which Smith is their teacher.
 
In addition to the various Smith-directed films, the company has also produced movies for other directors including Malcolm Ingram's Drawing Flies and Small Town Gay Bar, Bryan Johnson's Vulgar, Vincent Pereira's A Better Place, and Brian Lynch's Big Helium Dog.

The company's logo was originally a smiling clown with a 5 o' clock shadow dressed in women's lingerie and platform pumps, named "Vulgar" which gained controversy due to its content and was later changed to a cartoon Jay and Silent Bob with movie equipment. In 2022, with the release of Clerks III, the logo has changed again, this time to Vulgar the Clown's face.

Films
Clerks (1994; with Miramax Films)
Mallrats (1995; with Gramercy Pictures)
Drawing Flies (1996)
Chasing Amy (1997; with Miramax)
A Better Place (1997)
Big Helium Dog (1999)
Dogma (1999; with Lionsgate; Miramax sold distribution rights)
Vulgar (2000; with Lionsgate)
Jay and Silent Bob Strike Back (2001; with Dimension Films)
Jersey Girl (2004; with Miramax)
Oh, What a Lovely Tea Party (2004)
Clerks II (2006; with The Weinstein Company and Metro-Goldwyn-Mayer)
 Back to the Well: Clerks II (2006)
Small Town Gay Bar (2006)
Zack and Miri Make a Porno (2008; with The Weinstein Company)
Bear Nation (2010)
Jay & Silent Bob's Super Groovy Cartoon Movie! (2013; with SModcast Pictures)
Jay and Silent Bob Reboot (2019; with Saban Films)
KillRoy Was Here (2022; with SModcast Pictures and Semkhor Productions)
Clerks III (2022; with Lionsgate)

Television shows
Clerks: The Animated Series (2000) – ABC

See also
SModcast Pictures
View Askewniverse

References

External links
 The View Askewniverse - Company’s homepage
View Askew Productions on Internet Movie Database

Television production companies of the United States
View Askewniverse
Mass media companies established in 1994
American companies established in 1994
1994 establishments in New Jersey
Film production companies of the United States
 
 
Kevin Smith